Ebba Hult de Geer (2 June 1882-28 July 1969) was a Swedish geologist known for her development of the geochronology of Sweden.

Biography
Ebba Hult was born at  Rödeby parish in Blekinge, Sweden.
Hult was a teacher at Risbergska  in Örebro 1902–04 and at Whitlockska in Stockholm 1904–07. She studied at Stockholm University 1906–08. She was a research assistant and secretary working with her husband, Gerard de Geer (1858-1943) who she married in  1908.

De Geer was a professor of geology at Stockholm University  and an influential participant in international geology.   In 1924 De Geer retired from teaching and became the founder-director of the Geochronological Institute at Stockholm University.
Following her husband's death in 1943, Hult became leader of  Stockholm University Geochronological Institute.

Hult managed to create her own role as researcher in geochronology.
She used varved clay in glacial lakes as evidence for ancient climates (paleoclimatology) and studied similar deposits worldwide to establish a global climate history.

References 

1882 births
1969 deaths
 People from Blekinge
Stockholm University alumni
Quaternary geologists
20th-century Swedish geologists
Swedish women geologists